Lincoln Historic District may refer to:

 Lincoln Historic District (Hingham, Massachusetts), listed on the National Register of Historic Places (NRHP)
 Lincoln Historic District (Lincoln, New Mexico), also NRHP-listed

See also
 Lincoln Park Historic District (disambiguation) (of which there are at least three)